James Calvin Spivey (born March 7, 1960 in Schiller Park, Illinois) is a former American middle-distance runner and Olympian. Spivey took up competitive running in Illinois where he became one of the best high school runners from his state. He was the 1982 NCAA DI men's 1500-meter champion with Indiana University. Spivey enjoyed a long Olympic career, in which he participated in the Olympic Summer Games in 1984, 1992, and 1996.

Running career

High school
Spivey began running competitively in 1975 as a sophomore in cross country and on the track at Fenton High School in Bensenville, Illinois. He was runner-up at state cross country his junior and senior year, running 14:00 for three miles at the Illinois State course in Peoria, Illinois. In Track and Field he was a state qualifier in the two-mile his sophomore year, was runner-up in the two-mile his junior year in 9:00.5, and state champion in the half mile his senior year. His times of 1:50.2 880 yards was the #1 ranked high school time in the country; and mile of 4:06.2 was the 2nd fastest high schooler for 1978.

Collegiate
Spivey attended Indiana University from 1978 to 1983. In 1982 he was the NCAA champion in the men's 1500 meters. During his college career, Spivey's training fluctuated seasonally to adjust to cross country in the fall and track in the winter and spring; his weekly mileage ranged from under 40 to over 80 miles depending on his race schedule.

International
In 1984, he also won the Olympic Trials and placed 5th in the Los Angeles Olympic Games. His time of 3:36.06 was the fastest run by an American in the Olympic final until the 2012 London Olympic Games in which Leo Manzano ran 3:34.90 to claim 2nd place.

His greatest success came at the World Championships in Rome 1987 over 1500 m where he won a bronze medal. He also won the Silver Medal at the 1987 Pan American Games in Indianapolis, Indiana. The following year, however, Spivey failed to qualify for the 1988 Summer Olympics (finishing fourth at the US trials in Indianapolis) in the same season in which he set his personal best over 1500 m (3:31.01, Koblenz).

In 1992 Spivey won the US Olympic trials 1500 meters in New Orleans ahead of Steve Holman to qualify for the Olympic Games in Barcelona, where he came eighth.

In 1996 Spivey competed in the Olympic 5000m competition in Atlanta, where he was a semi-finalist with a 14:27.72. He also currently holds the American record for the 2,000 m at 4:52.44 set in Lausanne, Switzerland in 1987. His personal bests include 1:46.5 800 m 1982 San Francisco; 2:16.05 1000 meters 1984 Eugene, Oregon; 3:49.80 mile 1986 Oslo, Norway; 7:37.07 3000 m 1993 Cologne, West Germany and 13:15.86 5000 meters 1994 Berlin, Germany at age 34. He was a member of the 1983 Helsinki, Finland; 1987 Rome; 1991 Tokyo; 1993 Stuttgart, Germany and 1995 Gothenburg, Sweden USA World Championship teams.

Coaching
Spivey was the head coach of men and women cross-country and track and field at the University of Chicago from 1997-2001, and had 13 all-Americans of the athletic department's 24 during that time. One individual won four NCAA Division III titles in 1999-2000. From 2001-2005, he was the head women's cross-country coach/assistant track and field coach at Vanderbilt University, including being able to coach to SEC champions and one all-American in the 5000 meter run.

As a college coach, Spivey used a series of quotes to motivate his athletes. He would say, "Sit in the chair" to explain the importance of trusting the coach. "No deposit, no return" signified that desirable results in the championship end of the season would only come with hard work early on in the season. "The hay is in the barn" was used during the championship end of the season to remind the athletes that they'd already done all the work they could do and now was time to reap the benefits. The phrases "Reach out and slap a hand," "People in the Sears Tower would pay to run with you guys" and "It's great to be alive" were all used to motivate athletes during hard workouts. Additionally, he often used the call and response, "Hip hip?" "Hooray!" during particularly grueling workouts. His running idol was Sebastian Coe.

He currently lives in Wheaton, Illinois and works for ASICS America corporation since 2006.  He moved over from Team Sales to Sports Marketing in May 2018, working with college and other sponsored programs throughout the United States.  He started the Jim Spivey Running Club in 1990, and enjoys coaching a group in Wheaton Jim Spivey Running Club. He helped coach Wheaton Academy high school in West Chicago for 4 years, the boys' and girls' cross country teams and assistant role in track.  He is presently a volunteer coach for the girls' cross country and track teams at Wheaton North in Wheaton, Il. Also, one of his form mid-1990 JSRC runners is the head coach at Latin High School in downtown Chicago.  Coach Dan Daly asked Jim to help him coach his boys' and girls' cross country and track teams, beginning in August 2017 - The partnership with Jim writing the training and Dan implementing the workouts, to have Dan's first ever Illinois State Champion in the 1600m run in May 2018, a freshman who ran 4:56.  He also coaches individuals and high school groups during the off-season, and gives motivational speeches and coaching clinics. Jim's signature is handing out half-sticks of gum to his runners after the workout.

Personal bests
 800 m -- 1:46.5 (1982)
 1000 m -- 2:16.54 (1984)
 1500 m -- 3:31.01 (1988)
 Mile—3:49.80 (1986)
 2000 m -- 4:52.44 (1987, American record)
 3000 m -- 7:37.04 (1993)
 5000 m -- 13:15.86 (1994)

Source: TrackandFieldNews.com

References

External links

 Official Site JimSpivey.com

Videos of Jim Spivey
At the Dream Mile, Olympics and elsewhere

1960 births
Living people
American male middle-distance runners
Athletes (track and field) at the 1984 Summer Olympics
Athletes (track and field) at the 1992 Summer Olympics
Athletes (track and field) at the 1996 Summer Olympics
Athletes (track and field) at the 1987 Pan American Games
Olympic track and field athletes of the United States
Sportspeople from Wheaton, Illinois
Track and field athletes from Illinois
World Athletics Championships medalists
Pan American Games silver medalists for the United States
Pan American Games medalists in athletics (track and field)
People from Wood Dale, Illinois
Big Ten Athlete of the Year winners
Medalists at the 1987 Pan American Games
Indiana Hoosiers men's track and field athletes